Tom Viggiano is an American former ice hockey player and head coach who previously headed the program at Kent State.

Career
Tom Viggiano was named as the interim head coach for Kent State when John Wallin resigned in the summer of 1987. After a poor showing Kent declined to remove his interim tag and began to search for a full-time replacement. While Viggiano was considered for the position it ultimately went to Bill Switaj.

Head coaching record

College

References

External links

Living people
Year of birth missing (living people)
American ice hockey coaches
Kent State Golden Flashes men's ice hockey coaches